Christopher Nicholas "Nick" Bertke (born 26 July 1988), better known by his stage name Pogo, which is symbolized by an icon of a rabbit, is a South African-born Australian electronic musician. Much of his work consists of recording small sounds, quotes, and melodies from films, TV programmes or other sources, and sequencing the sounds together to form a new piece of music (a genre also known as plunderphonics). A number of Pogo's works consist almost entirely of the sounds he samples, with few or no additional music or sound samples.

Music
Pogo has produced tracks using samples from films and TV shows such as Pulp Fiction. He has also sampled from other sources, such as field recordings for his project Remix the World. Remix the World was an ambitious project, consisting of all original content. Bertke shot real-world footage and then used those sounds and images to capture the essence of the places he visited. The Real World Remix was shot in Kenya, South Africa, Bhutan, and Perth (AU).

Bertke is best known for his use of video sampling to produce music videos, which he uploads on the video-sharing website YouTube. As of October 2017, his most popular YouTube video is Alice, made of samples of Disney's animated film Alice in Wonderland, with more than 30 million views. In 2010, his music video Gardyn, created from footage of his mother working in her garden, was juried along with 24 other YouTube videos for an exhibition at the Guggenheim Museum in New York City. On 29 September 2016, Pogo released a song called "Trumpular" on SoundCloud which consisted of quotes from Republican nominee, and later President, Donald Trump. Later, in 2019, he made a music video called "Homarge", based on The Simpsons (mostly from the episode "Simpson and Delilah"), which gained over a million views. On August 27, 2021, Pogo released a remix called "Strangerous", taking voices and sounds from Stranger Things, which has become Pogo's second most viewed on SoundCloud, and on November 5, 2021, he released "Cabin Fever", which samples Muppet Treasure Island.

Pogo's music is used on the conservative YouTube talk show Louder with Crowder, hosted by Steven Crowder, and is used as bumper music to transition in and out of commercial breaks.

Personal life
On his September 2011 US tour, Bertke was arrested and taken into custody for three weeks due to the lack of a proper work visa, and was prohibited from re-entering the United States until 2021.

In January 2020, Pogo's YouTube channel was hacked and hijacked by an unknown user, who renamed the channel "Ethereum 2.0 Foundation" and deleted all the videos on the channel. The hacker then started a scam livestream promoting Ethereum cryptocurrency, and claiming that any amount of crypto sent to them during the stream would be multiplied and sent back. Pogo took to Twitter to let fans know that he was aware of the hack and has contacted YouTube for help. The hacked channel was terminated by YouTube on January 17, and Pogo remained without a channel for four days while fans created accounts hosting temporary re-uploads of his videos and music. On January 22, YouTube restored the account, including his view counts, subscribers, and comments sections.

Controversies
Bertke was criticized for a 2015 video that derided feminists as gold diggers and "making misogynist arguments against women's rights". He later claimed that it was made "to impersonate the radical right".

In a YouTube livestream that was uploaded in 2016, Bertke stated that he has a "fairly robust resentment of the gay community". In the same video and on the topic of the Orlando nightclub shooting, a terrorist attack at a gay bar in Florida in 2016, he said, "It amazes me to see the West welcoming a culture through the floodgates that wants gays dead. I think that's fantastic". Bertke later claimed to not have any hate for the gay community and also claimed Asperger syndrome and bipolar disorder as contributing factors. He stated that the video was made in bad taste and that he never intended for it to go public, although he also stated that he was trying to "impersonate the far-right and create hysteria", noting that the video was made around the time of the 2016 American election. YourEDM compared his "homophobic rhetoric" to the 2015 video, which he similarly tried to explain as a social experiment. Writing for The Verge, Megan Farokhmanesh saw this explanation as a transparent attempt at plausible deniability.

Discography

Albums 
 Texturebox (release date: 30 December 2010)
 Wonderpuff (release date: 27 June 2011)
 Forgotten Fudge (release date: 2 November 2013)
 Star Charts (release date: 22 December 2014)
 Kindred Shadow (release date: 11 June 2015)
 Weightless (release date: 30 December 2016)
 Ascend (release date: 22 February 2018)
 Quantum Field (release date: 29 December 2018)
 Valley of Shadow (release date: 4 March 2020)
 Cultures (release date: 28 December 2020)
 Cosmoluxe (release date: 7 January 2022)

EPs 
 Wonderland (release date: 28 May 2007)
 Broken Beats (release year: 2008)
 Table Scraps (release year: 2008)
 Weave and Wish (release date: 22 March 2009)
 Deeper Down the Rabbit Hole (release date: 30 November 2010)
 Fluctuate (release date: 5 January 2014)
 Perfect Chaos (release date: 21 May 2014)
 Younghood (release date: 8 June 2014)
 Unity (release date: 18 February 2020)

See also
 Deep Forest
 Kutiman
 Todd Edwards
 The Avalanches
 DJ Shadow

References

External links
 
 Pogo at Last.fm
 

1988 births
Living people
South African expatriates in Australia
Musicians from Perth, Western Australia
Ableton Live users
People with Asperger syndrome
People with bipolar disorder